Gilmor may refer to:

 Harry Gilmor (1838-1883), Baltimore City Police Commissioner
 Gilmor's Raid, a raid that was part of an overall campaign against Union railroads during the American Civil War

See also
Gillmor
Gilmore (disambiguation)
Gilmore (surname)
Gilmour (disambiguation)
Gilmour (surname)